Sodium channel protein type 2 subunit alpha , is a protein that in humans is encoded by the SCN2A gene.  Functional sodium channels contain an ion conductive alpha subunit and one or more regulatory beta subunits.  Sodium channels which contain sodium channel protein type 2 subunit alpha are sometimes called Nav1.2 channels.

Function 

Voltage-gated sodium channels are transmembrane glycoprotein complexes composed of a large alpha subunit with four domains including 24 transmembrane segments and one or more regulatory beta subunits. They are responsible for the generation and propagation of action potentials in neurons and muscle. This gene encodes one member of the sodium channel alpha subunit gene family. It is heterogeneously expressed in the brain, and mutations in this gene have been linked to several seizure disorders. Several alternatively spliced transcript variants of this gene have been described, but the full-length nature of some of these variants has not been determined.

Clinical significance 

Mutations in this gene have been implicated in cases of autism, infantile spasms, bitemporal glucose hypometabolism, and bipolar disorder.

See also
 paralytic - SCN2A ortholog in Drosophila

References

Further reading

External links 
Patient Organizations 

SCN2A Asia Pacific 

SCN2A Germany e. V. 

 
 

Sodium channels